Olle Källgren (7 September 1907 – 13 April 1983) was a Swedish football defender who played for Sweden in the 1938 FIFA World Cup. He also played for Sandvikens IF.

References

External links
FIFA profile

1907 births
1983 deaths
Swedish footballers
Sweden international footballers
Association football defenders
Sandvikens IF players
1938 FIFA World Cup players